Parallels may refer to:

 Circle of latitude (also parallels), an abstract east–west small circle connecting all locations around Earth at a given latitude
 Parallels (company), a software company based in Bellevue, Washington
 Parallels Desktop for Mac, software providing hardware virtualization for Macintosh computers with Intel processors
 Parallels Server for Mac, server-side desktop virtualization product built for the Mac OS X Server platform
 Parallels Workstation, first commercial software product released by Parallels, Inc.
 Parallels (engineering), rectangular blocks of metal which have faces ground or lapped to a precise surface finish

Arts & entertainment
 British Blockade (also Parallels), a patience game or solitaire of the blockade family
 Parallels (album), the sixth studio album by American progressive metal band Fates Warning
 Parallels (band), a Canadian synthpop band from Toronto
 Parallels (film), a 2015 American science-fiction adventure film
 Parallels (TV series), a French science-fiction-mystery streaming television series for children and adolescents
 "Parallels" (Star Trek: The Next Generation), the 11th episode of the seventh season of the American science fiction television series
 "Parallels", the third track from Yes' 1977 album Going for the One
 "Parallels", song by As I Lay Dying from the album The Powerless Rise, 2010

See also
 Parallel (disambiguation)